1991 Emperor's Cup Final was the 71st final of the Emperor's Cup competition. The final was played at National Stadium in Tokyo on January 1, 1992. Nissan Motors won the championship.

Overview
Nissan Motors won their 5th title, by defeating Yomiuri 4–1. Nissan Motors was featured a squad consisting of Shigetatsu Matsunaga, Masami Ihara, Tetsuji Hashiratani, Kazushi Kimura and Renato.

Match details

See also
1991 Emperor's Cup

References

Emperor's Cup
1991 in Japanese football
Yokohama F. Marinos matches
Tokyo Verdy matches